Arun Kumar Chanda (1899–1947),  was an Indian independence activist from Cachar district of Assam..The Government of India issued a stamp in his honour. He was a social worker and writer who also edited the Bengali Weekly Saptak. In Silchar, a law college named A. K. Chanda Law College was established in 1960 in his memory.

References

1899 births
1947 deaths
20th-century Bengalis
Indian independence activists from Assam
People from Cachar district